Charles March-Phillipps (28 May 1779 – 24 April 1862) was a British Radical politician from Garendon Park in Leicestershire. He sat in the House of Commons in two periods between 1818 and 1837.

Personal life 
He was the eldest son of Thomas March Phillipps (formerly March) of More Critchell, Dorset, and was educated at Sherborne School (until 1791), Eton College (1793–1796) and Sidney Sussex College, Cambridge (1800–02). He was a captain in the Leicestershire Yeomanry from 1803 to 1807. He succeeded his father to Garendon Hall, Leicestershire, in 1817.

He married Harriet, the daughter of John Gustavus Ducarel of Walford, Somerset, and had two sons and a daughter. His son Ambrose Charles Lisle March Phillipps De Lisle converted to Roman Catholicism and founded Mount St Bernard Abbey.

Political career 
He was elected at the 1818 general election as one of the two Members of Parliament (MPs) for Leicestershire,
and held the seat until 1820, when he did not contest the election. He was returned again at the 1831 general election, and held the seat until the 1831 general election, when the county was divided under the Reform Act. He was then elected for the new Northern division of Leicestershire, and held the seat until he stood down at the 1837 general election.

He was appointed High Sheriff of Leicestershire for 1825–26.

References

External links 
 

1779 births
1862 deaths
People from Loughborough
People educated at Sherborne School
People educated at Eton College
Alumni of Sidney Sussex College, Cambridge
Whig (British political party) MPs for English constituencies
Members of the Parliament of the United Kingdom for Leicestershire
UK MPs 1818–1820
UK MPs 1831–1832
UK MPs 1832–1835
UK MPs 1835–1837
Place of birth missing
High Sheriffs of Leicestershire
Leicestershire Yeomanry officers
People from the Borough of Charnwood